Saint-Aubin is a commune in the Pas-de-Calais department in the Hauts-de-France region of France. It won silver prize in the Entente Florale in 2000.

Geography
Saint-Aubin is located 5 miles (8 km) west of Montreuil-sur-Mer on the D144E1 road.

Population

Places of interest
 The church of St. Aubin, dating from the seventeenth century
 An eighteenth-century dovecote

See also
Communes of the Pas-de-Calais department

References

Saintaubin